Heathfield railway station was located on the Adelaide-Wolseley line serving the Adelaide Hills suburb of Heathfield. It was located 33.2 km from Adelaide station, and at an elevation of

History 

It is unclear when the station was opened. It consisted of one 85-metre-long platform and a waiting shelter. The station was located opposite Bogaduck Road next to the present-day pedestrian crossing.

The station closed on 23 September 1987, when the State Transport Authority withdrew Bridgewater line services between Belair and Bridgewater. It has since been demolished.

References 

 South Australian Railways Working Timetable Book No. 265 effective 30 June 1974

External links
 Flickr gallery
 Bridgewater to Adelaide front view - Redhen Railcar

Disused railway stations in South Australia
Railway stations closed in 1987
1987 disestablishments in Australia